Cronulla High School is an Australian school from grades 7–12. Opened in 1961, the school has an enrolment of approximately over 1,200 students from 7 through to year 12. It has programs in athletics, music, drama, dance, computing and all other major academic areas. The school features a developed Performing Arts Program.

See also

Lists of schools in New South Wales

References

Educational institutions established in 1961
1961 establishments in Australia
Public high schools in Sydney
Cronulla, New South Wales